Same-sex marriage has been legal in Campeche since 20 May 2016. In April 2016, Governor Alejandro Moreno Cárdenas introduced a same-sex marriage bill to the Congress of Campeche, which was approved on 10 May and entered into force 10 days later. Campeche had previously recognized same-sex couples in the form of civil unions only, which were enacted in 2013 and grant couples several of the rights and benefits of marriage.

Legal history

Civil unions
On 11 April 2013, the Party of the Democratic Revolution (PRD) introduced a measure to legalize civil unions. The bill was passed unanimously by the Congress of Campeche on 20 December 2013 and, while it applies to both same-sex and opposite-sex couples, it does not provide same-sex couples with the same rights, benefits and obligations as marriage. An additional distinction is that civil unions are not registered with the civil registry like marriages, but with the Public Registry of Property and Commerce (Registro Público de la Propiedad y de Comercio). Since 2016, couples in civil unions can legally adopt.

Same-sex marriage

Background

On 31 March 2014, a lesbian couple, María José Estrada Muñoz and Faride Zulema Cabrera Can, applied for a marriage license in San Francisco de Campeche, but were rejected based on the decision that same-sex couples can only enter into civil unions and cannot legally marry. In July 2014, the Mexican Supreme Court declared that the marriage laws in the state were unconstitutional and ordered Congress to modify the Civil Code to allow same-sex marriages. It was later announced that the couple could marry after a district judge had granted them an amparo, but the law still had to be revised. The conservative National Action Party (PAN) said it would abide by the ruling. The couple married on 30 August 2014. In September 2014, the PRD announced that 8 couples, 5 from San Francisco de Campeche and 3 from Ciudad del Carmen, had filed amparos and that analysis of changing the marriage statutes was in progress.

On 11 August 2015, the Supreme Court ruled in a 9–1 decision that Campeche's ban on same-sex couples adopting children was unconstitutional. The court struck down article 19 of the civil union law which had outlawed adoption by civil partners. Children's rights were cited as the main reason for the court's decision. The ruling set a constitutional precedent, meaning all bans in Mexico forbidding same-sex couples from adopting are unconstitutional and discriminatory. President of the Supreme Court, Luis María Aguilar Morales, voted with the majority and wrote the following in the ruling:

On 23 September 2016, the Supreme Court finalised the ruling in the adoption case against Campeche and issued a nationwide jurisprudence which binds all lower court judges to rule in favor of same-sex couples seeking adoption and parental rights. Campeche's ban on same-sex adoption was lifted on 26 September.

Legislative action
On 4 April 2016, Governor Alejandro Moreno Cárdenas submitted a same-sex marriage bill to the Congress of Campeche. Shortly thereafter, the two largest parties in the state, the Institutional Revolutionary Party (PRI) and the National Action Party, announced their support for the bill. On 4 May, the president of the Board of Directors said the bill would be voted on sometime in May 2016. On 10 May, Congress voted 34–1 to approve the same-sex marriage bill. It was published in the official state gazette on 16 May and came into effect on 20 May.

Article 157 of Campeche's Civil Code now reads as follows:
 in Spanish: Establece que el matrimonio es la unión de dos personas para llevar una vida en común, en donde ambas se deben procurar respeto, igualdad y ayuda mutua. Debe celebrarse ante las autoridades del Registro Civil tal y como lo establece este Código y con las formalidades que éste exige.
 (It is established that marriage is the union of two people to build a community of life, in which both partners must seek respect, equality and mutual aid. Marriage is contracted by the authorities of the Civil Registry as set out in this Code and with the formalities it requires.)

In June 2016, Adriana de Jesús Avilez Avilez was expelled from her party, the National Regeneration Movement (MORENA), over her decision to vote against the legislation.

On 14 June 2016, opponents of same-sex marriage filed an injunction against the new law, arguing that "it was unfairly imposed on Campechanos", and refuted allegations of homophobia. On 7 July 2016, a federal judge ruled in favor of a stay. A spokesperson for Congress said the judge's injunction only bars the plaintiffs from marrying a partner of the same sex. According to the president of Congress, Ramón Méndez Lanz, same-sex couples can continue to get married in the state.

Marriage statistics
The following table shows the number of same-sex marriages performed in Campeche since legalization in 2016 as reported by the National Institute of Statistics and Geography. Figures for 2020 are lower than previous years because of the restrictions in place due to the COVID-19 pandemic.

Public opinion
A 2017 opinion poll conducted by Gabinete de Comunicación Estratégica found that 42% of Campeche residents supported same-sex marriage, one of the lowest in the nation, while 55% were opposed.

According to a 2018 survey by the National Institute of Statistics and Geography, 56% of the Campeche public opposed same-sex marriage. This was the third highest in Mexico, after Chiapas (59%) and neighboring Tabasco (56.5%).

See also

 Same-sex marriage in Mexico
 LGBT rights in Mexico

Notes

References

External links
 Text of the Campeche same-sex marriage law (in Spanish)

Campeche
Campeche
2016 in LGBT history